Brewton City School District  is a school district in Escambia County, Alabama, United States.

External links
 

Education in Escambia County, Alabama
School districts in Alabama